The 1982–83 National Football League was the 52nd staging of the National Football League (NFL), an annual Gaelic football tournament for the Gaelic Athletic Association county teams of Ireland.

Down defeated Armagh in the final.

Format

Group stage

Division One

Table

Division Two

Play-Off

Table

Division Three

Table

Division Four

Table

Knockout stage

Semi-finals

Finals

National League Cup

Semi-finals

Final

References

National Football League
National Football League
National Football League (Ireland) seasons